Mukundgarh is a small city and a municipality in Nawalgarh tehsil Jhunjhunu district in the Indian state of Rajasthan. It is part of Shekhawati region. It lies a few kilometres from Nawalgarh.

Geography
It has an average elevation of 349 metres (1148 feet).

Demographics
The Mukundgarh Municipality has population of 18,469 of which 9,314 are males while 9,155 are females as per report released by Census of India, 2011. Population of Children with age of 0-6 is 2732 which is 14.79% of total population of Mukundgarh. Female Sex Ratio is of 983 against state average of 928. Moreover Child Sex Ratio in Mukundgarh is around 852 compared to Rajasthan state average of 888. Literacy rate of Mukundgarh city is 73.28% higher than state average of 66.11%. In Mukundgarh, Male literacy is around 85.60% while female literacy rate is 61.05%.

See also
Shekhawati
Thikanas of Shekhawati
Shyam Sunder Surolia

References

Cities and towns in Jhunjhunu district